was a diplomat and government official of the  in the Imperial Household Ministry. He was born in Hyūga Province.

He was the third of four sons. His father,  was an elder of the Takanabe Domain. His younger brother, was an official in the Ministry of Agricultural and Trade Affairs, and contributed to the growth of the Sumitomo Zaibatsu.  was his brother-in-law.

He attended Kagoshima Medical School, but dropped out. He graduated from the Japanese Ministry of Justice Law School.

He worked in the Ministry of Justice for a time, but then became a diplomat. He worked as a diplomat to Sweden, the Japanese ambassador to Belgium, and the ambassador extraordinary to Austria-Hungary, before leaving office in 1914. He worked as a plenipotentiary advisor at the Paris Peace Conference in 1919.

During his time as ambassador to Belgium, in 1908, he observed a British Boy Scout event. He reported his findings to others, which spread word of the Boy Scout movement to Japan.

He later become the member of the lay organisation and praticising Nichiren Buddhism.

Sources 

Much of this article was translated from the equivalent article in the Japanese Wikipedia, as retrieved on October 20, 2006.

1858 births
1945 deaths
Scouting in Japan
Scouting pioneers
Members of Sōka Gakkai
Ambassadors of Japan to Austria
Ambassadors of Japan to Belgium